Claudia G. Kauffman (born July 15, 1959) is an American politician who is a member of the Washington State Senate representing the 47th district. A member of the Democratic Party, she is the first Native American (Nez Perce) woman elected to the upper chamber.

She previously served the district for one term, from 2007 to 2011. She lost her reelection in 2010 before making a successful return to the Senate in 2022.

Biography

Kauffman was born in Idaho in 1959 to John and Josephine Kauffman. She was the youngest of seven children and moved with her family to the Beacon Hill neighborhood of Seattle when she was an infant. She attended Cleveland High School and later studied at the University of Idaho and the Oglala Lakota College.

Kauffman and her friend Iris Friday were influenced by "one legendary mentor" Bernie Whitebear who introduced Kauffman to the State Senate in the 1980s on visits to Olympia to lobby for local programs. In 1999, as a private consultant to the Oglala Sioux tribe, she coordinating the visit of President Bill Clinton to the Pine Ridge Indian Reservation in South Dakota. In 2002, she and Friday, a member of the Tlingit tribe, founded the Native Action Network.

In 2006, Kauffman defeated ex-Kent police chief Ed Crawford in the Senate primary and Republican Mike Riley, with 52 percent of the vote, in the general election. She focused on education and other issues. She was defeated after her first term in the November 2010 general election by Joe Fain, a former chief of staff to King County Councilman Pete von Reichbauer. In 2017 she lost a race for Seattle Port Commissioner Position 1. 

In 2011, she was serving as the intergovernmental liaison for the Muckleshoot tribe and was living in Kent with her husband and three children. In 2022, she defeated Republican Bill Boyce to reclaim her old senate seat following the retirement of fellow Democrat senator Mona Das.

References

External links
 Biography at HistoryLink
 Project Vote Smart - Senator Claudia Kauffman (WA) profile
 Follow the Money - Claudia Kauffman
 2006 campaign contributions
 Washington Senate Democratic Caucus - Claudia Kauffman profile

1959 births
Living people
Nez Perce people
Native American state legislators in Washington (state)
Native American women in politics
People from Kent, Washington
Washington (state) state senators
Women state legislators in Washington (state)
21st-century American women